Flip cup (also called tip cup, canoe, or taps) is a team-based drinking game where players must, in turn, drain a plastic cup of beer and then "flip" the cup so that it lands face-down on the table. If the cup falls off the table, any player can return said cup to the playing field. 
Several flip cup  tournaments have been held in the United States.

A 2017 survey by the American Addiction Centers found flip cup to be the most quickly intoxicating drinking game played by those surveyed, with participants being able to reach a theoretical blood alcohol content of 0.08, the legal driving limit, within 20 minutes of play.

It was first played in Baltimore, Maryland  in May 1980 by Overlea School Students and gained popularity throughout the summer in Ocean City, Maryland. The original name was called “The Dave Stack Drinking Game”.

Gameplay

Two teams of an equal number of players stand on opposite sides of a table, facing one another. The players directly facing are opponents. In front of each teammate is a disposable plastic cup filled with a set amount of beer. Generally, the first line inside a disposable cup is used as a marker.

At the start, it is customary for the initiating players to make a toast, after which the first member of each team drinks the entirety of their  beverage. When finished, the cup is placed open side up at the edge of the table, and the player who drank it attempts to flip the cup, by flicking or lifting the bottom of the cup until it flips and lands face down on the table, If a cup is knocked over in the chain whilst moving to the next cup the player must go back and re-flip. The player may not use two hands, or blow on the cup to guide it to flip over. If the player is unsuccessful on the first try, the cup is reset and re-flipped. Only after the first teammate is done flipping successfully can the next person proceed. Additionally, subsequent players may not touch or manipulate their cup until the previous player has successfully flipped their cup. Whichever team finishes drinking and flipping all its cups first wins.

Game variants

Batavia Downs
Batavia Downs flip cup varies slightly from the original version. Batavia Downs flip cup takes place around a circular table and requires a minimum of four players. Two players standing opposite of each other, start at the same time. As each player successfully drinks from and flips their cup the next person to their right (counter clockwise) goes. In addition, after each successful flip, players must refill their cup in the event that the player standing directly left of them successfully lands their cup. The game continues as a circular race until a player is unable to successfully flip their cup, before the person directly to their left flips theirs.

Essentially, Batavia Downs flip cup has only a loser (the last player attempting to flip their cup).

Survivor Tippy Cup
The game starts exactly the same as the original version but once a team loses a round they must vote off one member of their team. That team is still responsible for drinking the same number of cups as their opponents in the next round and thus must designate a player to flip more than one cup. A team wins when their opponents have no remaining players to vote off.

21 Cup
The game starts the same as the original, but instead of finishing when all team members have taken a turn, they must continue until the cup has been flipped a total of 21 times. The team that wins chooses to scalp a player from the other team, usually their best player. This causes losing teams to have to flip more cups per person, causing a possible feedback loop. The game ends when the winning team consists of all the players.

References 

Drinking games
Australian games